Prestige Consumer Healthcare Inc. (formerly Prestige Brands, Inc.) is an American company that markets and distributes over-the-counter healthcare and household cleaning products. It was formed by the merger of Medtech Products, Inc., Prestige Brands International, and the Spic and Span Company in 1996. The company is headquartered in Tarrytown, New York and operates a manufacturing facility in Lynchburg, Virginia.

Among the brands owned by Prestige are Chloraseptic sore throat products, Clear Eyes, Compound W wart treatment, Dramamine motion sickness treatment, Efferdent denture care, Luden's throat drops, BC Powder and Goody's Headache Powder, Pediacare & Little Remedies children's OTC products and Beano (dietary supplement).

The company's CEO and president is Ron Lombardi, who replaced Matthew Mannelly on June 1, 2015.

History
Prestige Brands Holdings, Inc. was established in 1999 to acquire, revitalize, and line extend leading, often neglected but healthy brands that were considered non-core at major consumer products companies. In 2004, MidOcean Partners sold Prestige Brands to GTCR Golder Rauner.

Acquisitions

The company acquired Blacksmith Brands' portfolio of five brands in 2010.

In December 2011, the company agreed to purchase 17 brands from GlaxoSmithKline including BC Powder, Beano, Ecotrin, Fiber Choice, Goody's Powder, Sominex and Tagamet for $660 million.

In 2013, Prestige Brands Holdings, Inc. acquired Care Pharmaceuticals of Bondi Junction, New South Wales, Australia, a privately held marketer and distributor of over-the-counter (OTC) healthcare brands for children and adults.

In 2014, the company purchased Hydralyte in Australia and New Zealand from the Hydration Pharmaceuticals Trust of Victoria, Australia. Hydralyte is the leading oral rehydration product in Australia and New Zealand.

In April 2014, Prestige Brands Holdings, Inc. announced that it has entered into a definitive agreement to acquire Insight Pharmaceuticals Corporation, a marketer and distributor of feminine care and other over-the-counter healthcare products, for $750 million in cash.

In November 2015, Prestige Brands Holdings, Inc. announced that it has entered into a definitive agreement to acquire DenTek Oral Care Inc. (DenTek), a privately-held marketer and distributor of oral care products for $225 million in cash.

In December 2016, Prestige Brands Holdings, Inc. agreed to buy C.B. Fleet Co. from private-equity firm Gryphon Investors for about $825 million.

In July 2021, consumer health business assets were acquired from Akorn Operating Company, LLC for $228.9 million adding TheraTears and other products to their brands.

Divestitures

In 2009, Prestige sold its Denorex and Prell brands of shampoo. It has since divested Fiber Choice, PediaCare, New-Skin, and Dermoplast (2016).

In 2018, Prestige sold off their household cleaning supply division.

Products 
Prestige Consumer Healthcare owns many over-the counter medicines and products, including:

Digestive care
 Bacid
 Beano
 Dramamine
 Fleet
 Kondremul
 Phazyme
 Tagamet

Eye, ear, nose, and throat
 Allerest PE
 Auro
 Capastat
 Chloraseptic
 Clear Eyes
 Debrox
 Luden's throat lozenges
 Murine Ear & Murine Tears
 NasalCrom
 Nostrilla
 Stye
 Sucrets

Oral care
 DenTek
 Efferdent
 Effergrip
 Ezo
 Fresh Guard by Efferdent
 Gly-Oxide
 OraBrush
 The Doctor's

Pain relief
 Ecotrin
 Anacin
 BC Powder
 Diabet Aid
 Goody's Powder
 Percogesic
 Stanback

Pediatric care
 Boudreaux's Butt Paste
 Caldesene
 Gentle Naturals
 Little Remedies
 Pedia-Lax

Skin care
 Americaine
 Boil Ease
 Chapet
 Cloverine Salve
 Compound W
 Dermarest
 Freezone
 Mosco
 Nix
 Outgro
 Oxypor
 Skin Shield
 Ting
 Wartner

Sleep aids
 Compul
 Nytol
 Sominex

Women's health
 Monistat
 Norforms
 Summer's Eve
 Uristat
 Vitron C

References

External links

Marketwatch - Prestige Brands Hldgs Inc.

 
Companies listed on the New York Stock Exchange
Companies based in Westchester County, New York
Pharmaceutical companies established in 1996
American companies established in 1996
Pharmaceutical companies of the United States
1996 establishments in New York (state)
Tarrytown, New York
Personal care companies